Darina Al Joundi is a Lebanese-born stage actor. She became a French citizen after Prime Minister Manuel Valls read a review of her performance at the 2012 Avignon Festival and decided to speed up her application. She has promoted women's rights for the French government.

Early life
Darina Al Joundi was born circa 1969. Her father, Hassem Al Joundi, was a Syrian author and politician. She grew up in a Muslim family and attended Catholic schools. After she was sent to a psychiatric hospital run by nuns in Jounieh, she decided to emigrate to France.

Career
Al Joundi became an actress in France. She co-wrote Le jour où Nina Simone a cessé de chanter, a one-woman show about her struggle to obtain French citizenship, with Algerian playwright Mohamed Kacimi. Her performance at the 2012 Festival d'Avignon received good reviews from theatre critics. After Prime Minister Manuel Valls read an article about her in Le Monde in 2012, he decided to speed up her application for French citizenship.

On September 27, 2012, Al Joundi was invited to speak at the French Ministry of Women's Rights by Minister Najat Vallaud-Belkacem alongside the editor-in-chief of Marie-Claire, Catherine Durand.

Works

Filmography

References

External links

Living people
1960s births
French people of Syrian descent
Lebanese people of Syrian descent
Lebanese emigrants to France
Lebanese stage actresses
French stage actresses
French women's rights activists